Phospho3D is a database  of 3D structures of phosphorylation sites derived from Phospho.ELM.

See also 
 Phospho.ELM
 Protein structure

References

External links 
 http://www.phospho3d.org/.

Biological databases
Post-translational modification
Phosphorus